Zibraaz Sahib, sometimes wrote as Zibraz, (born 9 September 1989) is a Fijian footballer who plays as a midfielder for Fijian club Lautoka and the Fiji national team.

Club career
Sahib started his career in the youth of Lautoka. In 2010 he moved to the first team and made his debut and he is still playing for the club up to today.

International career
In 2015 Sahib was called up by for the Fiji national football team to play a friendly against Tonga national football team. He made his debut on 19 August 2015, in a 5–0 victory against Tonga.

References

External links
 

Living people
1989 births
Fijian people of Indian descent
Fijian footballers
Association football midfielders
Fiji international footballers